Alonzo Saclag is a Filipino musician and dancer who is a recipient of the National Living Treasures Award.

Background
Alonzo Saclag was born on August 4, 1942. A member of the Kalinga people and a native of Lubuagan, Kalinga province, Saclag taught himself of his people's traditions in the performing arts. He learned how to play traditional Kalinga musical instruments and Kalinga ritual dance movements without formal or informal instruction.

Saclag worked to revive the dying tradition of playing the gangsa, a type of Kalinga gong. Saclag lobbied for two years with the provincial government to grant funds to convert the abandoned Capitol Building into a museum. With support from the provincial government and other financiers, a branch of the National Museum was established in Lubuagan.

Saclag also campaigned for the promotion of Kalinga culture in schools in his community by engaging in talks with the institutions' administrators. He is instrumental in establishing the practice of children wearing traditional Kalinga clothing for important school events as well as the teaching of Kalinga folk songs in schools. He also lobbied for the broadcast of traditional Kalinga music along with contemporary music in their local radio station. He also formed the Kalinga Budong Dance Troupe with the intent of promoting Kalinga dance to a wider audience.

Saclag was conferred the National Living Treasures Award in 2000. By 2016, he had established a village within his town, named Awichon, which aims to promote Kalinga culture to tourists.

Personal life
Saclag is married to a woman named Rebecca with whom he has nine children.

References

Filipino musicians
Filipino male dancers
People from Kalinga (province)
1942 births
Living people
National Living Treasures of the Philippines